The 22113 / 14 Lokmanya Tilak Terminus–Kochuveli Express is a Superfast Express train belonging to Indian Railways' Central Railway Zone that runs between  and  in India.

It operates as train number 22113 from Lokmanya Tilak Terminus to Kochuveli and as train number 22114 in the reverse direction, serving the states of Maharashtra, Goa, Karnataka & Kerala.

Coaches
The 22113 / 14 Lokmanya Tilak Terminus–Kochuveli Express has 1 AC First class, 1 AC 2-tier, 5 AC 3-tier, 9 sleeper class, 4 general unreserved & two EOG coaches . It does not carry a pantry car.

As is customary with most train services in India, coach composition may be amended at the discretion of Indian Railways depending on demand. The train has LHB coach.

Service

As the average speed of the train is above , as per railway rules, its fare includes a Superfast surcharge.

Routing

,  to Kochuveli.

Traction
It is hauled by a Lallaguda based WAP-7 electric locomotive from end to end.

References

External links
22113 Lokmanya Tilak Terminus–Kochuveli Express at India Rail Info
22114 Lokmanya Tilak Terminus–Kochuveli Express at India Rail Info

Express trains in India
Transport in Mumbai
Rail transport in Maharashtra
Rail transport in Goa
Rail transport in Karnataka
Rail transport in Kerala
Transport in Thiruvananthapuram
Konkan Railway